Fulda is a city in Murray County, Minnesota, United States. The population was 1,318 at the 2010 census.

Geography
The city is situated on the north end of Fulda Lake.

U.S. Highway 59 and Minnesota State Highway 62 are two of the main routes in the city.

Neighboring communities

Demographics

2010 census
As of the census of 2010, there were 1,318 people, 566 households, and 324 families residing in the city. The racial makeup of the city was 91.7% White, 0.8% African American, 0.2% Native American, 4.2% Asian, 1.5% from other races, and 1.5% from two or more races. Hispanic or Latino of any race were 3.3% of the population.

There were 566 households, of which 23.3% had children under the age of 18 living with them, 47.5% were married couples living together, 6.7% had a female householder with no husband present, 3.0% had a male householder with no wife present, and 42.8% were non-families. 38.5% of all households were made up of individuals, and 22.5% had someone living alone who was 65 years of age or older. The average household size was 2.17 and the average family size was 2.90.

The median age in the city was 46.8 years. 21.8% of residents were under the age of 18; 6.3% were between the ages of 18 and 24; 19.6% were from 25 to 44; 25.9% were from 45 to 64; and 26.5% were 65 years of age or older. The gender makeup of the city was 46.1% male and 53.9% female.

2000 census
As of the census of 2000, there were 1,283 people, 528 households, and 328 families residing in the city. The racial makeup of the city was 96.10% White, 0.08% African American, 0.55% Native American, 0.23% Asian, 2.18% from other races, and 0.86% from two or more races. Hispanic or Latino of any race were 3.27% of the population.

There were 528 households, out of which 26.5% had children under the age of 18 living with them, 54.5% were married couples living together, 4.5% had a female householder with no husband present, and 37.7% were non-families. 35.0% of all households were made up of individuals, and 24.4% had someone living alone who was 65 years of age or older.  The average household size was 2.28 and the average family size was 2.94.

In the city, the population was spread out, with 24.0% under the age of 18, 4.8% from 18 to 24, 23.4% from 25 to 44, 18.2% from 45 to 64, and 29.6% who were 65 years of age or older.  The median age was 44 years. For every 100 females, there were 83.0 males.  For every 100 females age 18 and over, there were 80.2 males.

The median income for a household in the city was $30,000, and the median income for a family was $37,500. Males had a median income of $26,469 versus $18,750 for females. The per capita income for the city was $15,184.  About 4.1% of families and 6.1% of the population were below the poverty line, including 4.7% of those under age 18 and 11.2% of those age 65 or over.

History 

The city of Fulda was founded in 1881 along the Milwaukee Road primarily by German settlers, though also by Scandinavian and Irish.  The community was named for Fulda in Hessen, Germany. Fulda is still predominantly an agricultural city.

Although the rail line was discontinued in 1980, the two-story depot building, along with a section of track, has been preserved and is listed on the National Register of Historic Places.  The lower level of the depot is currently used as an antique museum and store.  The other building in the city on the National Register is the former Citizens State Bank building.

Fulda has a Civil War cannon located in its city park.  This cannon is a three-inch (76 mm)  rifled gun and was purchased for $155 on June 25, 1892, by the Zach Taylor Post No. 42 of the Grand Army of the Republic.

Notable people
 Fulda was the birthplace of Harold Hotelling, a mathematical statistician and very influential economic theorist.
 Baseball Hall of Famer and Negro league pitcher Hilton Smith played for Fulda's semi-pro baseball team in 1949 and 1950.
 Sports columnist Patrick Reusse of the Minneapolis Star-Tribune spent his early years in Fulda.
 The Continental Co-ets, America's first touring all-girl rock & roll band, originated in Fulda in 1963.
 Ted Winter, former Minnesota House Majority Leader and longtime state representative (1987–2003) is from Fulda.

Community and culture
Local churches include First Presbyterian Church (PCUSA), Saint Gabriel's Catholic Church, Solid Rock Assembly, and Saint Paul's (LCMS) and Immanuel American (ELCA) Lutheran churches.

Local organizations include American Legion post 318, Boy Scout troop 123, Fish and Game Club, Jaycees, VFW post 9017.

Education

There are two schools in Fulda, Fulda Elementary and Fulda Secondary (also known as Fulda High School).  Formerly operating in Fulda were the St. Gabriel's Catholic School and Fulda Lutheran School.

Fulda Public Schools
Fulda Public Schools consists of Fulda Elementary School and Fulda Secondary School (or Fulda High School). It co-operates many sports with neighboring districts. These include football, girls' basketball, baseball, softball, track and field, and golf with Heron Lake-Okabena, known as the Heron Lake-Okabena/Fulda Coyotes, and wrestling with Murray County Central, known as the Fulda/MCC Warriors. In addition to the youth in Fulda, the school district also has students from neighboring communities including Avoca, Iona, Dundee, Kinbrae, Wilmont, and Reading among others.

Accomplishments
 2006 Class A Girls Basketball Champions
 2007 Class A Girls Basketball Champions

St. Paul's Lutheran School

Fulda's Lutheran school closed in 2018 and had been in existence since 1893.

St. Gabriel's Catholic School

Library
Fulda Memorial Library is a member of the Plum Creek Library System.  It was expanded in 2002.

The Library was initially found in 1918 when it started to receive funding from the city, and was located in different businesses. On April 14th, 1970 the library building was officially opened across from the city hall. In 1975 the library officially became a member of the Plum Creek Library System. In 1977 the Friends of the Library group was formed to raise funds for the library.

Politics
Fulda is located in Minnesota's 7th congressional district, represented by Detroit Lakes accountant Collin Peterson, a Democrat. At the state level, Fulda is located in Senate District 22, represented by Republican Bill Weber, and in House District 22A, represented by Republican Joe Schomacker.

References

External links
 Satellite Image of Fulda from Google Maps
 Fulda Community Guide

Cities in Minnesota
Cities in Murray County, Minnesota